Turkish-Arab relations may refer to:

Arab League-Turkey relations
Algeria–Turkey relations
Egypt-Turkey relations
Turkey-Morocco relations
Libya-Turkey relations
Iraqi-Turkish relations
Turkish-Lebanese relations
Kuwait-Turkey relations
Palestine-Turkey relations
Saudi Arabia-Turkey relations
Syria-Turkey relations
Turkey-United Arab Emirates relations